Shakin' Things Up is the sixth studio album by American country music artist Lorrie Morgan, released in 1997 via BNA Records.

Billboard charting singles included "Go Away" at #3, "One of Those Nights Tonight" at #14, "I'm Not That Easy to Forget" at #49, and "You'd Think He'd Know Me Better" at #66. The album was certified gold by the RIAA.

Track listing

Personnel

 Brittany Allyn - background vocals
 Sam Bush - mandolin
 Larry Byrom - acoustic guitar
 Scott Coney - background vocals
 John Cowan - background vocals
 John Deaderick - piano
 Steve Dorff - string arrangements, conductor
 Dan Dugmore - steel guitar
 Stuart Duncan - fiddle, mandolin
 Craig "Flash" Fletcher - mandolin, background vocals
 Larry Franklin - fiddle
 Paul Franklin - dobro, steel guitar
 Carl Gorodetzky - string contractor
 Vern Gosdin - background vocals
 Michael Landau - electric guitar
 Brent Mason - electric guitar
 Howard Mayberry - drums
 Lorrie Morgan - lead vocals
 Joshua Motohashi - acoustic guitar, steel guitar
 The Nashville String Machine - strings
 Steve Nathan - keyboards, piano
 Dave Pomeroy - bass guitar
 Jon Randall - background vocals
 Matt Rollings - piano
 Brent Rowan - electric guitar
 Joe Spivey - bass guitar, fiddle
 Kyle Tullis - bass guitar
 Jim Vest - steel guitar
 Lonnie Wilson - drums, percussion

Chart performance

References

1997 albums
BNA Records albums
Lorrie Morgan albums
Albums produced by James Stroud